Evolution: International Journal of Organic Evolution, is a monthly scientific journal that publishes significant new results of empirical or theoretical investigations concerning facts, processes, mechanics, or concepts of evolutionary phenomena and events. Evolution is published by Oxford Academic (formerly by Wiley) for the Society for the Study of Evolution. Its current editor-in-chief is Tracey Chapman of the University of East Anglia, United Kingdom.

Former editors-in-chief
The journal was founded soon after the Second World War. Its first editor was the evolutionary geneticist Ernst Mayr.

 Ruth Geyer Shaw,  July 2013 – 2017
 Daphne Fairbairn, 2010 – June 2013

References

External links
Official website at Oxford Academic
Former official website at Wiley

Evolutionary biology journals
Publications established in 1947
Academic journals published by learned and professional societies of the United States
Wiley-Blackwell academic journals
Monthly journals
English-language journals